OTSA can stand for:

 Oklahoma Tribal Statistical Area
 Orthodox Theological Society in America

See also
 Otsa, a village in Estonia